La Mer de Sable is an amusement park founded 1963 and is located in Ermenonville Forest. The park is close to the commune of Ermenonville in the Oise department of northern France. The park is owned and operated by the Looping Group.

History 
The park was founded by the French actor Jean Richard in 1963 on lands leased by from the Institut de France. The park was bought by Compagnie des Alpes in July 2005, who at the time owned Parc Astérix, another amusement park only 5 km away. The park was then sold to its current owner, the Looping Group in 2015.

References 

Amusement parks in France
Amusement parks opened in 1963
1963 establishments in France
Tourist attractions in Oise